Zahari is both a given name and a surname. Notable people with the name include:

Given name

Zahari Dimitrov (born 1975), Bulgarian footballer
Zahari Sirakov (born 1977), Bulgarian footballer
Zahari Stoyanov (1850–1889), Bulgarian revolutionary
Zahari Zhandov (1911–1998), Bulgarian film director
Zahari Zograf (1810–1853), Bulgarian painter

Airil Rizman Zahari (born 1978), Malaysian golfer
Mohd Shafei Zahari (born 1993), Malaysian footballer
Said Zahari, Singaporean journalist
Shafie Zahari (born 1993), Malaysian footballer